Němčice may refer to places in the Czech Republic:

Němčice (Blansko District), a municipality and village in the South Moravian Region
Němčice (Domažlice District), a municipality and village in the Plzeň Region
Němčice (Kolín District), a municipality and village in the Central Bohemian Region
Němčice (Kroměříž District), a municipality and village in the Zlín Region
Němčice (Mladá Boleslav District), a municipality and village in the Central Bohemian Region
Němčice (Pardubice District), a municipality and village in the Pardubice Region
Němčice (Prachatice District), a municipality and village in the South Bohemian Region
Němčice (Strakonice District), a municipality and village in the South Bohemian Region
Němčice (Svitavy District), a municipality and village in the Pardubice Region
Němčice, a village and administrative part of Ivančice in the South Moravian Region
Němčice, a village and administrative part of Meclov in the Plzeň Region
Němčice, a village and administrative part of Loket in the Central Bohemian Region
Němčice, a village and administrative part of Předslav in the Plzeň Region
Němčice, a village and administrative part of Sedlice in the South Bohemian Region
Dolní Němčice, a village and administrative part of Dačice in the South Bohemian Region
Horní Němčice, a municipality and village in the South Bohemian Region
Němčice nad Hanou, a town in the Olomouc Region
Velké Němčice, a market town in the South Moravian Region

See also
Nemčice, a municipality and village in Nitra Region, Slovakia